Grant Wayne Krieger is a prominent Canadian who in May 1996 travelled to Holland to obtain a prescription for Cannabis to help alleviate symptoms from Multiple Sclerosis. Since then he became a prominent cannabis rights advocate. In 1996 he began the controversy associated with medical marijuana.   Krieger openly admitted to using and selling marijuana from his home in Regina, due to his own illness, multiple sclerosis, and various medical conditions of his customers. In 1998 he moved his family to Calgary and was seen on the steps of the Calgary courthouse giving a fellow medicinal user an ounce of weed. He was charged with trafficking and more court appearances were scheduled. Krieger elated with not guilty verdict. 
In 2000 Krieger won a judicial ruling, allowing him to use Marijuana for personal medical purposes.

In June 2001 Krieger was acquitted on charges of possessing and trafficking Marijuana.

In December 2003 Krieger was convicted of trafficking Marijuana.  But this conviction was overturned by the Supreme Court in October 2006, who found the trial judge erred in compelling the jury to convict Krieger.

On March 27, 2007, Krieger was sentenced to four months in jail for trafficking in marijuana.  The same judge, also ordered that Krieger be provided Marijuana for medical purposes, while in jail.  Because Corrections Canada indicated they would not allow him to use Marijuana, the judge deferred the sentence to June 2007, to give them time to accommodate Krieger use of Marijuana.

In March 2009, Mr. Krieger was placed on probation for 18 months by the Alberta Court of Appeal. In December 2009, the Manitoba Court of Queen's Bench imposed a term of probation of nine months.

References

Canadian cannabis activists
Living people
1954 births
People from Calgary
People with multiple sclerosis
Canadian drug traffickers